Iñaki León Merino (born 13 February 2000) is a Spanish professional footballer who plays as a central defender for CF Fuenlabrada Promesas Madrid 2021.

Club career
Born in Vitoria-Gasteiz, Álava, Basque Country, León represented Deportivo Alavés and Getafe CF as a youth. On 30 June 2019, after finishing his formation, he signed for Tercera División side CD Torrijos.

León made his senior debut on 25 August 2019, starting and being sent off in a 0–2 away loss against Calvo Sotelo Puertollano CF. He scored his first goal on 27 October, netting the opener in a 1–1 draw at CD Madridejos.

On 19 July 2021, León renewed his contract with Torrijos for a further year, with the club in the Tercera División RFEF. On 28 December, however, he moved to CF Fuenlabrada and was initially assigned to the reserves also in the fifth division.

León made his first team debut for Fuenla on 6 January 2022, starting in a 0–1 home loss against Cádiz CF in the season's Copa del Rey.

References

External links

2000 births
Living people
Footballers from Vitoria-Gasteiz
Spanish footballers
Association football defenders
Segunda División players
Tercera División players
Tercera Federación players
CF Fuenlabrada B players
CF Fuenlabrada footballers